Granite Harbour is a British police procedural television drama series set in Aberdeen, Scotland. It is based on an idea by Adriel Luff & Kul Muhay. The series was first broadcast on BBC Scotland on 1 December 2022, followed by BBC One.

Plot
Former Sergeant in the Royal Military Police now detective Davis Lindo and his partner DS Lara Bartlett must solve the murder of an oil tycoon in Aberdeen.

Cast
 Dawn Steele
 Romario Simpson as Davis Lindo
 Hannah Donaldson as DS Tara ‘Bart’ Bartlett
 Katia Winter as Karolina Andersson
 Michelle Jeram as DS Simone 'Monty' Montrose
 Gary Lewis as Shay Coburn
 Hiftu Quasem as Sandy Hepburn
 Caroline Deyga as Hannah Couffs
 Andrew Still as Rory Dashford

Episodes

Reception
Stuart Jeffries of The Guardian gave it three out of five stars.

References

External links 
 

2020s British drama television series
2020s British crime drama television series
2020s British police procedural television series
2022 British television series debuts
BBC crime drama television shows
British detective television series
English-language television shows
Television shows set in Scotland